Bruce Chambers may refer to:

 Bruce Chambers (American football), American football coach
 Bruce Chambers (footballer) (born 1959), Australian rules footballer